Ivan Valente (born 5 July 1946) is a Brazilian politician, teacher and engineer. He has been a member of the Socialism and Liberty Party (PSOL) since 2005 and is a federal deputy for the state of São Paulo. He is the party leader at the Chamber of Deputies, and was PSOL's president from 2011 to 2013.

References 

|-

|-

|-

Socialism and Liberty Party politicians
Members of the Legislative Assembly of São Paulo
Members of the Chamber of Deputies (Brazil) from São Paulo
Workers' Party (Brazil) politicians
Brazilian communists
1946 births
Living people